Cystidia is a genus of moths in the family Geometridae.

Species
 Cystidia couaggaria Guenée, 1857
 Cystidia indrasana (Moore, [1866])
 Cystidia stratonice (Stoll, [1782])
 Cystidia truncangulata Wehrli, 1934

References
 Cystidia at Markku Savela's Lepidoptera and Some Other Life Forms
 Natural History Museum Lepidoptera genus database

Ennominae